Liam Neeson is an Irish actor who rose to prominence with his acclaimed starring role in Steven Spielberg's 1993 Oscar winner Schindler's List. He has since starred in a number of other successful films, including Star Wars: Episode I – The Phantom Menace, Taken, Michael Collins, Les Misérables, Batman Begins, Kinsey, Clash of the Titans, and The Chronicles of Narnia series. 

He has been nominated for a number of awards including an Academy Award for Best Actor, a BAFTA Award for Best Actor in a Leading Role and three Golden Globe Awards for Best Actor in a Motion Picture Drama. Empire magazine ranked Neeson among both the "100 Sexiest Stars in Film History" and "The Top 100 Movie Stars of All Time."

Film

Television

Male actor filmographies
British filmographies
Irish filmographies

Theatre

Video games

Audiobook narration

Discography

References

External links